The Streatfeilds, Streatfields or Stretfields are an aristocratic English family of the landed gentry, from Chiddingstone, Kent. The family are traceable to the early 16th century and are a possible cadet branch of the Noble House of Stratford. They were significant landowners in Sussex, Surrey and Kent, and instrumental in shaping those counties throughout the 17th and 18th centuries. From the early 16th century until 1900 the family seat was Chiddingstone Castle. The family later sold the castle to Lord Astor in 1938.

Notable members
Robert Streatfeild (1514 – March 1599) is recognised as the common ancestor of most living Streatfeilds and Streatfields. There are still direct descendants of his living in Chiddingstone.

Robert Streatfeild's descendants include:

Henry Streatfeild (1706–1762), substantial British landowner
Alexander Streatfeild-Moore (1863–1940), English cricketer
Edward Champion Streatfeild (1870–1932), English cricketer 
Philip Streatfeild (1879–1915), English painter and bohemian
Richard Streatfeild (1559–1601), iron master who established the financial basis for the family
Richard Streatfeild (1833–1877), English cricketer
Sidney Streatfeild (1894–1966), Scottish Unionist Party politician
Thomas Streatfeild (1777–1848), renowned antiquarian and churchman
Rev. William Champion Streatfeild (1839–1912), clergyman
Sir Henry Streatfeild (1857–1938), British Army officer and courtier who served as the commanding officer of the Grenadier Guards, and was Equerry to Edward VII from 1908 until the King's death in 1910, he was then Private Secretary and Equerry to Queen Alexandra from 1910 until her death in 1925
William Champion Streatfeild (1865–1929), Anglican Bishop of Lewes
Noel Streatfeild (1895–1986), author, most famous for her children's books
Ruth Gervis (1894–1988), artist, art teacher and illustrator of children's books, most famously Ballet Shoes, written by her sister, Noel Streatfeild. She was also a founding member of Sherborne Museum, Dorset.
Geoffrey Streatfeild (1975-), actor in film, television, stage and radio.

Possible Stratford descent

The House of Stratford has a remarkably similar coat of arms attributed to them in the former half of the 14th century. This could be seen as evidence that the Streatfields, though their line cannot be traced beyond the 1500s, are in fact a cadet branch of the Stratford family, the name having been corrupted at some point prior to the 16th century.

Reunion
In July 2014 a significant number of direct descendants of Robert Streatfeild met for a memorial service in St Mary’s Church, Chiddingstone, followed by a gathering at Chiddingstone Castle, home of many generations of Streatfeilds (having been expanded by Henry Streatfeild (1639-1709) from a house in the High Street to the Restoration style that it is now).

References

 
Stratford family
English families
English gentry families